The First Step is an 2021 American documentary film, directed by Brandon Kramer. It follows Van Jones, as he pushes for criminal justice reform.

It had its world premiere at the Tribeca Film Festival on June 10, 2021. It is scheduled to be released on February 17, 2023, by Meridian Hill Pictures.

Synopsis
The film follows Van Jones as he pushes for criminal justice reform.  Louis L. Reed, Jessica Jackson, Virgie Walker, Pete White, Tylo James, Fabian Debora, Douglas Copenhaver, Martin West, Dee Pierce, William Thompson, Rhonda Edmunds, Jared Kushner, Bernie Sanders, Cory Booker, Kamala Harris, Shelley Moore Capito, Rand Paul, Mike Lee, Karen Bass, Bonnie Watson Coleman, Patrisse Cullors, Charlamagne tha God Karen Hunter and Kim Kardashian appear in the film.

Release
The film had its world premiere at the Tribeca Film Festival on June 10, 2021. It also screened at AFI Docs on June 23, 2021. It is scheduled to be released on February 17, 2023, by Meridian Hill Pictures.

Critical reception
The First Step holds a 85% approval rating on review aggregator website Rotten Tomatoes, based on 13 reviews, with a weighted average of 6.80/10.

References

External links
 
 
 

2021 films
2021 documentary films
American documentary films
Documentary films about politics
Documentary films about law
Documentary films about law in the United States
2020s English-language films
2020s American films